Tuuliajolla is the third solo studio album by Finnish reggae artist Raappana. Released on 22 March 2013, the album peaked at number five on the Finnish Albums Chart.

Track listing

Chart performance

References

2013 albums
Raappana (musician) albums